Farmers' suicides in the United States refers to the national occurrences of farmers taking their own lives, largely since the 1980s, partly due to their falling into debt, but as a larger mental health crisis among U.S. agriculture workers. In the Midwest alone, over 1,500 farmers have taken their own lives since the 1980s. It mirrors a crisis happening globally: in Australia, a farmer dies by suicide every four days; in the United Kingdom, one farmer a week takes their own life; and in France it is one every two days. In India more than 270,000 farmers have died by suicide since 1995.

Farmers are among the most likely to die by suicide, in comparison to other occupations, according to a study published in January 2020 by the Centers for Disease Control and Prevention (CDC). Researchers at the University of Iowa found that farmers, and others in the agricultural trade, had the highest suicide rate of all occupations from 1992 to 2010, the years they studied in 2017. The rate was 3.5 times that of the general population. This echoed a study conducted the previous year by the CDC.

Background

In 1980, president Jimmy Carter implemented a grain embargo against the Soviet Union as the "New" Cold War began. "My net worth dropped $20,000 overnight", said Iowan farmer Wendell Tuttle in 2013.

In 1985, the Farm Credit System (FCS) lost $2.7 billion – the largest one-year loss of any financial institution in U.S. history. That same year, 40-year-old Iowa farmer Dean Hagedorn walked into a bank in Spencer with a check for $94,000, the proceeds of that year's corn crop from his  farm. He planned to use three-quarters to keep his bank loan payments up to date and to parcel the remainder out to other creditors, but the bank kept the entire amount.

"There's a silent atrophy creeping across the heartland", said Joan Blundall, a mental health counselor in rural Iowa, in 1987. "And I don't think anyone knows yet where we are headed."

As of 2019, farm debt was at $416 billion, an all-time high. Over half of all farmers have lost money every year since 2013, and farm loan delinquencies are increasing. Also in 2019, median farm income was projected to be −$1,644.

Causes of farmers' suicides
Several causes of the farmers' suicides have been pinpointed:

loss of pride in being able to either keep their farm, or run it to its full potential. Some farmers expect to reach certain milestones, such as passing the farm on to the next generation or expanding their facility 
prices for commodities such as corn, soybeans, milk and meat had shrunk by around half between 2012 and 2020

farm debt had increased by around a third since 2007, rising to levels last experienced in the 1980s. Interest rates rose from single digits to 21.5% in 1981. A $28-billion federal-aid provision, rolled out by the Trump administration over two years, did not provide enough to recoup income lost during the China–United States trade war
physical isolation can make it hard for farmers to get assistance for their mental-health problems
the consolidation of rural schools, resulting in farm children having to ride on the bus for hours each day
inclement weather, including the Midwestern floods and the droughts of 1983 and 1988, had prevented farmers from utilizing almost  in just 2019.
soybean exports to China had dropped 75% from 2017 to 2018

A study published in 2021 found that food producers have higher rates of depression, anxiety and suicide risk (with self-blame being the only variable that had a significant association with this risk).

In Oklahoma, specifically, Eric Ramírez-Ferrero (who grew up in Enid) found that "large numbers of people could not keep up with technological progress and have had their expectations of a comfortable life frustrated."

Localities affected

Midwest
More than 900 farmers took their own lives in five upper Midwest states during the 1980s farm crisis, described as "the worst agricultural economic crisis since the Great Depression". Between 2014 and 2018, over 450 more committed suicide, although the actual total is believed to be higher because not every state provided suicide data for each year, some redacted portions of the data, and some reported the deaths as agricultural accidents. 75 farmers committed suicide across six Midwestern states in 2017. That total increased by one the following year. Of those 76 farmers, eighteen lived in Missouri and Kansas, fifteen in Wisconsin, thirteen in Illinois and twelve in North Dakota.

Iowa

Philip Fetter, of Chelsea, took his own life on July 25, 1982, aged 47, leaving his wife of 24 years, Norma, to care for ten children on her own, as well as overwhelming debt. Their farm and house were sold back to the Federal Land Bank at a substantial loss. Norma survived her husband by 37 years. She died in 2019, aged 85.

On April 3, 1985, Daniel Cutler, of Sioux City, shot himself at an abandoned farmstead on his way back home to his wife, Karen, after visiting family. Cutler, 38, left a message hinting at where his suicide note could be found. "The opening statement of the suicide note was 'The farm killed me,'" Karen (now Heidman) said.

Herman "Charlie" Behrens, of Sibley, tried to keep his family's 124-year farming tradition alive, but ultimately had to admit defeat. "I only had about $19,000 in loans", he said in 1987. "The same banker I dealt with all my life, he comes out one day and says the value of my machinery is $5,000 below the value of my loan. I said, 'You know me. I'm Charlie. I never missed a payment in all my years.' Then he points to the top line of my loan where it says payable on demand. They'd call up at 7:30 in the morning. 'You got any money yet, Charlie?' they'd ask. And then they'd call back at 8:30 at night. I didn't know people could get that way. But, you see, they were scared, too, with all the problems around. And they figured they'd better get something out of some of us while they could. There were a lot of heart attacks around these parts. And then Jean fell sick." She died in 1986.

On May 11, 2011, Matt Peters left a suicide note for his wife, Ginnie, on the desk in his workshop in Perry. He killed himself in his truck the following day.

Barb Kalbach, a corn and soybean farmer in Dexter, says that on the square mile of land where she lives, five different families used to grow corn, beans, hay, cattle and pigs. Since around 2005, the other four families have given up and moved out of town. Kalbach also now has to travel 75 miles to buy chemicals, and there is no longer a local farm equipment repair business. "All the thousands of farmers that have left the land — all the businesses have gone with them."

Kansas

John Blaske, of Onaga, said in 2017: "In the last 25 to 30 years, there's not a day that goes by that I don't think about suicide." He lost his house in a fire on Thanksgiving Day in 1982 which left him and his wife homeless. The farm crisis intensified around the same time, and their bank raised their interest rate from 7% to 18%. Blaske filed for bankruptcy and lost .

In 2017, suicide was the eighth-highest cause of death in Kansas. This ranked at 13th nationally for suicides.

Minnesota
Larry Ruhland, 56, of Watkins, died in 2006. He killed himself on the farm he operated with his wife, Barbara. "I didn't put it together, because I didn't even think of the fact that Larry was under as much stress as he was under", Barbara Ruhland said. She reached out to Ted Matthews, director of MN Rural Mental Health in Hutchinson. "He was a real, real guy who understood farmers and understood farm life and respected it but, at the same time, wanted you to understand how it could really suck you in and drain you completely dry", continued Ruhland. She rues the fact that her husband and Matthews did not meet.

Meg Moynihan runs a dairy farm with her husband around ten miles west of New Prague. Her husband struggled with depression and anxiety, but recovered. Moynihan realized the importance of mental health and, in 2021, wrote a grant proposal that resulted in that year's United States Department of Agriculture (USDA) award.

Ohio
Three farmers from the close-knit community of Georgetown committed suicide between mid-2015 and 2017.

Rural areas of Ohio have some of the highest rates of suicide state-wide, according to the Ohio Department of Health.

Several initiatives have been launched to combat the problem, including the "Ohio's Got Your Back" campaign.

Wisconsin
In Fremont, the Rieckmann family has been raising cattle for nearly two centuries. John Rieckmann and his wife, Mary, purchased a dairy farm from John's father, on land that had been in the family for three generations. As of 2019, the farm was $300,000 in debt, and it was making only $16 for every 100 pounds of milk sold, a 40% decrease from 2013. In January 2019, Wisconsin had 8,110 milk-cow herds, according to the state Department of Agriculture, Trade and Consumer Protection — 691 down on a year earlier.

Randy Roecker, a dairy farmer in Loganville, was losing $30,000 a month in 2019. His neighbor, 57-year-old Leon Statz, committed suicide in 2018 after financial struggles forced him to sell his fifty dairy cows. As a direct result of the incident, Roecker set up Farmer Angel Network, a support group for local families in the farming industry.

Emily Harris, a farmer in Monroe, is blunt with her perspective: "Just stop complaining about farming and quit. You can't make any money. Just be done." She and Brandi Harris shut down their 40-cow dairy in May 2019 after becoming several hundred thousand dollars in debt.

Colorado

As reported in 2021, drought conditions in western Colorado over two decades also led to suicides amongst its farmers.

Montana
Montana saw drought conditions from mid-2020 and throughout 2021. On top of that, an invasion of grasshoppers destroyed rangeland and crops. In August 2021, the U.S. Department of Agriculture put the quality of the state's spring wheat crop was 67%, "poor to very poor", with just 16% being "good". This led to mental-health concerns in the farming communities.

New York

After decreasing demand for dairy, as customers turned to milk alternatives, a spike in suicides occurred in the state of New York around 2015, resulting in the closure of several hundreds of farms. Dairy sales accounted for about half of total farm sales annually. New York was the third-largest milk-producing state in the U.S. in 2018, according to a New York Times article, although over 500 dairy farms around the state closed between 2012 and 2017. The population of dairy cows, however, was on the increase. After a local farmer took his life in January 2018, Agri-Mark, a large co-operative that was one of his customers, sent its 550 members in the state a list of suicide and mental-health hotline numbers. "It's not unusual to get woken up in the middle of the night by a farmer who is potentially suicidal", said Hal McCabe, outreach director for FarmNet.

Fred Morgan, of Eaton, was talked out of suicide by his wife, Judy. The family had become unable to repay six bank loans and debts to various entities. They declared bankruptcy, restructured their finances, and switched to producing organic milk. They were able to sell at $43 per hundredweight, which is about three times the average price for conventional milk. Switching to an organic operation is costly, however; for farmers in debt, it is not an option.

In January 2010, Dean Pierson, a 59-year-old dairy farmer in Copake shot all 51 of his milking cows before turning the gun on himself. He had left suicide notes on cow tag cards, saying he was "overwhelmed" by financial and personal issues.

Oklahoma

Between 1983 and 1989, a study revealed that 160 Oklahoman farmers took their own lives – an average of 26 for each of the six years. 43 of the 160 cases occurred in the one-year period between 1988 and 1989. Self-inflicted gunshots to the head or chest were the most common method of suicide.

The existing agricultural crisis line in the state, AG-Link, increased its services and expanded its team, allowing them to respond anywhere in the state. In the build-up to 1988, the team made an average of 120 annual intervention calls. By 1990, it averaged 175.

Pennsylvania
Brenda Cochran has been a farmer in Westfield since 1975, along with her husband, Joseph. She said she knows of nine suicides related to low milk prices between 2017 and 2019. "It's very, very bleak for us, and many farmers I know are in the same boat. It would take a miracle to sustain us for five years."

A member of Farm Women United, Cochran once had 300 cows; as of 2019 she had around 80.

Utah
In 2021, drought conditions in Moroni led to Wade and Tina Eliason suffering crop loss valued at over $300,000. Their 700-acre farm received 20% of the normal level of rainfall, which is not a lot, given that Utah is the second-driest state in the country behind Nevada. State agriculture officials estimate crop yields are down by 20% across the 18,400 farms in Utah. Water allotments were reduced by up to 75%, the deciding factors being how much moisture river drainages received and what kind of water right was in place (known as "first in time, first in right"). Wade Eliason said his talks with fellow farmers and ranchers has, on occasion, touched on the risk of suicide.

Newton farmer ValJay Rigby is a dry farmer, which means he is completely reliant on nature to water his crops. He dry farms 1,300 acres and has access to irrigation water on another 300 acres on his Cache County land.

Sex disparities
In a six-year study undertaken in Oklahoma, of the 160 farmer deaths by suicide, only three were females. This ratio is reflected nationwide, where men are a majority of suicides.

Assistance
Crisis hotlines, such as Iowa Rural Concern, began to appear nationwide during the 1980s.

In 1985, Kaye Hagedorn got her husband, Dean, in touch with a counselor, who told the farmer something shocking: he wasn't alone; countless other farmers were in trouble too. "And I learned", he said, "that I may have made some mistakes, but I wasn't a failure."

Calls to a hotline operated by Farm Aid nearly doubled, resulting in a drop in suicide rates. "Every state that had a telephone hotline reduced the number of farming-related suicides", says Mike Rosmann, an Iowan farmer-turned-psychologist. Rosmann received an average of seven calls per week in the spring of 2019 from distressed farmers.

An organization called Sowing Seeds of Hope (SSOH), formed in Wisconsin, connected uninsured and underinsured farmers in seven Midwestern states to behavioral-health services. It ran for fourteen years, fielding approximately 500,000 calls from farmers, as well as training over 10,000 behavioral-health professionals in rural communities and providing subsidized behavioral-health resources to over 100,000 families in the farming industry. It became the blueprint for a nationwide program called the Farm and Ranch Stress Assistance Network (FRSAN). Although the program was approved as part of the 2008 United States farm bill, it was not funded.

Many American farmers live in rural areas far removed from their nearest mental-health practitioner. Urban counties in the United States average ten psychiatrists per 100,000 people, whereas those in rural areas have around three for the same number of people. "I would really give about anything to go and talk to people", said John Blaske. "If any one person thinks they are the only one in this boat, they are badly mistaken. It's like Noah's Ark. It's running over."

In 2019, John Hanson, who runs an assistance hotline in Nebraska, says that he has received calls late at night from desperate farmers, "including one sitting in his kitchen with a loaded shotgun and the lights out."

In the state of New York, NY FarmNet, a farm support group, set up suicide-prevention training after a downturn in its farmers' fortunes.

It is not just the heads of the families who have been affected. High-school students in Oklahoma revealed that there was an unwritten rule prohibiting talk of their family's financial situation outside the home. This resulted in loneliness and depression, with the assumption that their situation was unique. Their parents' stress also affected them directly, often leaving them feeling like a burden. Effects of their situations were displayed by some with disruption of the classroom, while others endured "almost catatonic depression". They did want to talk; they wanted to talk to each other about their experiences.

As the 52nd executive order signed since his taking office in January 2021, president Joe Biden wanted farmers to have the right to repair equipment and to access to retail markets. The order looked to broaden competition in several agricultural areas:

 a review of the Packers and Stockyards Act (including protection for whistleblowers regarding infringements of the act)
 more funds for meat processing
 transparency in food labelling and contracts

The National Farmers Union (NFU) called these anti-concentration amendments a "monumental" step. "After suffering corporate abuse for so many years, it is reassuring that farmers may finally get a level playing field", NFU president Rob Larew said. "It will go a long way towards building the resilient, equitable food system that farmers and consumers deserve."

As of August 2021, if a farmer wants to sue a company for anti-competitive behavior under the act, they would need to prove the malpractice hurt not only them but the entire industry.

"This time seems to be different", Christopher Leonard, author of The Meat Racket, said, referring to the attempt Barack Obama made during his terms in office, albeit with the same Agriculture Secretary (Tom Vilsack). "There is a groundswell of support for antitrust reforms on both the left and right in Congress. If a program like this could ever get implemented, it seems like now is the best time in the past 20 years."

The United Food and Commercial Workers International Union (UFCW), which represents over one million workers in the food, healthcare and pharmacy industries, said the order was a "strong step to support American workers".

President of the American Farm Bureau Federation (AFBF), Zippy Duvall, said that the group would study the order's details and would work with the administration "to ensure changes are consistent with our grassroots policy, and farmers and ranchers are provided greater flexibility to remain competitive in our growing economy."

In addition, the USDA announced a plan to invest around $500 million to increase the capacity of meat-processing, with the aim of giving farmers, ranchers and consumers more choices. It also said that over $150 million will be given to existing smaller processing facilities to assist them during the COVID-19 pandemic.

In October 2021, U.S. Senators Jerry Moran and Roger Marshall announced $500,000 USDA Farm and Ranch Stress Assistance Network grant to the Kansas Department of Agriculture, with the aim of connecting farmers, ranchers and others in agriculture-centric occupations to mental-health resources.

Also in 2021, Michigan State University introduced a Health & Farm Stress Extension Educator. Remington Rice will provide outreach throughout Michigan but particularly in Antrim County, Benzie County, Grand Traverse County, Kalkaska County, Leelanau County and Manistee County. Rice is the fifth generation of a farming family in Benzie County.

In 2021, the Minnesota Department of Agriculture distributed funds to eleven local project partners via the department's "Bend, Don't Break" scheme.

Also in 2021, Frank King, a self-described "mental-health" comedian who has written for Jay Leno's Tonight Show, spoke to farmers and ranchers during the Montana Farm Bureau Federation convention, drawing on his personal story of depression and suicide (his grandmother and aunt killed themselves). In 2010, King filed a Chapter 7 bankruptcy and lost everything. He began making plans to take his own life, including looking over his $1-million life insurance policy. "I was worth more dead than alive", he said. King has given TED Talks on how to recognize signs of suicide and intervention methods.

References
General
Suicide and Stress in Farmers, Hawton, Keith (The Stationery Office, 1998) 
Agriculture in World History, Tauger, Mark B. (Taylor & Francis, 2010) 

Specific

External links
"Amid Trump Tariffs, Farm Bankruptcies And Suicides Rise" – Forbes, August 30, 2019
"A Deeper Look at the CDC Findings on Farm Suicides" – National Farmers Union
"Suicides in Farm Country" – Brownfield, agricultural news for America

Global issues
Suicides in the United States
Agricultural health and safety
Agriculture in the United States